Reorganized Latter Day Saints churches are Latter Day Saint denominations that reject the allegedly apostolic succession of Brigham Young.

List

Reorganization movement

Temple Lot-derived 
These include:

Fellow travellers among additional Latter Day Saint lineages 
Non-Joseph Smith III-lineaged churches that also reject Brigham Young's succession include:

 Church of Jesus Christ of Latter Day Saints (Strangite), founded in 1844
"Rigdonites", formed beginning in 1844
Church of Christ (Wightite), founded in 1844
Church of Christ (Whitmerite), founded in 1847
Church of Christ (Brewsterite), founded in 1848
Church of Jesus Christ of Latter Day Saints (Gladdenite), founded in 1851
Church of Jesus Christ (Cutlerite), founded in 1853
Reorganized Church of Jesus Christ (Bickertonite), founded in 1907
Fellowships of the remnants, founded in 2013

Background 

After the founder of the Latter Day Saint movement, Joseph Smith, Jr., was killed, the membership of Smith's church were disputed among themselves over the question of succession. Several individuals emerged with claims to leadership and the church's presidency. This led to the formation of several small factions. The majority of the church's members in Nauvoo, Illinois followed Brigham Young, who led them to the Great Basin area (in what is now Utah) as the Church of Jesus Christ of Latter-day Saints (LDS Church. Also, the term "Mormon" gradually primarily came to refer to members of the LDS Church.) The remaining individuals—who still considered themselves part of Smith's original church—remained; many who were in scattered congregations throughout the American Midwest joined other factions led by such leaders as Sidney Rigdon, James J. Strang, Lyman Wight, Alpheus Cutler, William Smith, and David Whitmer. Others began forming themselves into the a "reorganized" Church of Jesus Christ of Latter Day Saints.

Some Latter Day Saints believed that Smith had designated his eldest son, Joseph Smith III, as his successor; some of these individuals waited for young Joseph to take up his father's mantle. However, Smith III was only 11 years old at the time of his father's death; his mother, Emma Hale Smith, and their family remained in Nauvoo rather than moving to join any of the departing groups. In the 1850s, groups of Midwestern Latter Day Saints who were unaffiliated with other Latter Day Saint factions began to come together. Leaders, including Jason W. Briggs and Zenas H. Gurley, Sr., began to call for the creation of a "New Organization" of the Latter Day Saint movement. They invited Smith III to lead their New Organization; he accepted only after he believed he received a personal spiritual confirmation that this was the appropriate course of action. At a conference on April 6, 1860, at Amboy, Illinois, Smith III formally accepted the leadership of what was then known as the Church of Jesus Christ of Latter Day Saints. William Marks, former stake president of Nauvoo, served as Smith III's counselor in the reorganized First Presidency. The word "Reorganized" was added to the church's official name in 1872, mostly as a means of distinguishing it from the larger LDS Church, which at that time was involved in controversy with the U.S. government over its doctrine of plural marriage. The Reorganized Church of Jesus Christ of Latter Day Saints was often abbreviated "RLDS Church". Over time, many Mormons, mostly in the Midwest, who had not accompanied Brigham Young and his Latter-Day Saint followers to what is now Utah, began to join the new and growing Church. They included many former followers of James Strang, whose assassination in Wisconsin in 1856 left them disorganized and leaderless.

Provenance

See also
List of denominations in the Latter Day Saint movement#Reorganized church and other followers of Joseph Smith III ("Josephites")
Joseph Smith III#Reorganization of the church
List of denominations in the Latter Day Saint movement#Other lineages of succession
Reorganized Church of Jesus Christ (disambiguation)
Remnant church (disambiguation)

House of worship
Reorganized Church of Jesus Christ of Latter Day Saints, or Plano Stone Church

Legal cases
Reorganized Church of Jesus Christ of Latter Day Saints v. Church of Christ, an 1890s U.S. legal case 
Reorganized Church of Jesus Christ of Latter Day Saints v. Williams, an 1880 Ohio legal case

References

Further reading

Launius, Roger D.; Thatcher, Linda, eds. (April 1998), Differing Visions: Dissenters in Mormon History, Champaign, IL: University of Illinois Press, retrieved June 29, 2010

External links
 

Latter Day Saint denominations
Reorganized churches